Lios an Gharráin (anglicised Lissagurraun) is a townland of Moycullen near Barna in County Galway, Ireland. There are only 10 houses, and no shops or schools. There is one horse riding school, the Moycullen Riding Centre. There are roughly 24 inhabitants. It is close to the Moycullen Bogs.

References

Towns and villages in County Galway
Articles on towns and villages in Ireland possibly missing Irish place names